This article shows the rosters of all participating teams at the 2017–18 CEV Women's Champions League 
in several countries.

Pool A

ASPTT Mulhouse
The following is the roster of the France club ASPTT Mulhouse in the 2017–18 CEV Women's Champions League.

Head coach:  Magali Magail

CS Volei Alba-Blaj
The following is the roster of the Romania club CS Volei Alba-Blaj in the 2017–18 CEV Women's Champions League.

Head coach:  Darko Zakoč

Developres SkyRes Rzeszów
The following is the roster of the Poland club Developres SkyRes Rzeszów in the 2017–18 CEV Women's Champions League.

Head coach:  Lorenzo Micelli

Voléro Zürich
The following is the roster of the Switzerland club Voléro Zürich in the 2017–18 CEV Women's Champions League.

Head coach:  Gil Ferrer Cutiño

Pool B

Agel Prostějov
The following is the roster of the Czech Republic club Agel Prostějov in the 2017–18 CEV Women's Champions League.

Head coach:  Miroslav Čada

Fenerbahçe SK Istanbul
The following is the roster of the Turkey club Fenerbahçe SK Istanbul in the 2017–18 CEV Women's Champions League.

Head coach:  Jan De Brandt

Imoco Volley Conegliano
The following is the roster of the Italia club Imoco Volley Conegliano in the 2017–18 CEV Women's Champions League.

Head coach:  Daniele Santarelli

Igor Gorgonzola Novara
The following is the roster of the Italia club Igor Gorgonzola Novara in the 2017–18 CEV Women's Champions League.

Head coach:  Massimo Barbolini

Pool C

Chemik Police
The following is the roster of the Poland club Chemik Police in the 2017–18 CEV Women's Champions League.

Head coach:  Jakub Głuszak

Dinamo Kazan
The following is the roster of the Russia club Dinamo Kazan in the 2017–18 CEV Women's Champions League.

Head coach:  Rishat Gilyazutdinov

Maritza Plovdiv
The following is the roster of the Bulgaria club Maritza Plovdiv in the 2017–18 CEV Women's Champions League.

Head coach:  Ivan Petkov

Vizura Ruma
The following is the roster of the Serbia club Vizura Ruma in the 2017–18 CEV Women's Champions League.

Head coach:  Dejan Desnica

References

Squads